Gianni Pacinotti, better known by the pseudonym of Gipi, is an Italian cartoonist, filmmaker, and author.

Biography
Born in Pisa in 1963, he began his career illustrating for the publishing and advertising industries.

He began illustrating stories and comics in 1992, and his work appeared in Cuore, Blue, Il Clandestino, Boxer, Il Manifesto and Lo Straniero.  His work also appears in La Repubblica.

His graphic novel Appunti per una storia di guerra (Notes for a War Story), published by Coconino Press, appeared in France and was published in the United States by First Second Books. It won the 2005 Goscinny Prize for Best Script and was proclaimed Best Book at Angoulême in 2006. Notes for a War Story follows three young men in a war-torn country –intended to be any number of European countries. "In the Italian version of the book", Gipi has remarked, "the name of the villages are Italian names, in the French version, French names. I didn't want the reader to think, ‘This war happens elsewhere, far from me.’ My intention was to make people think about the possibilities of a war suddenly arriving in their own home".

Gipi has created Gli innocenti (The Innocents) for the Ignatz Series and in 2006 this work earned him an Eisner Award nomination and a Max & Moritz Prize. The Innocents is about a reformed thug who takes his young nephew down to the seaside, where they visit an old friend who has just been released out of prison for a crime he did not commit.

Other work
In 2000, he founded Santa Maria Video.  Santa Maria is a studio through which he creates video and animation shorts. His debut as a film director, The Last Earthling, premiered at the 68th Venice International Film Festival.

In 2015, he successfully crowdfunded and launched Bruti, a card game about melee combats between warriors and enchanters set in a dark fantasy with a medieval feel. Gipi designed the game and illustrated each card. The deluxe version of the rulebook includes a long introductory comic.

Works

Graphic novels
Esterno notte (2003)
Notes for a War Story (Appunti per una storia di guerra, 2004)
Garage Band (Questa è la stanza, 2005)
S. (2006)
LMVDM – La mia vita disegnata male (2008)
One Story (Unastoria, 2013)
Land of the Sons (La terra dei figli, 2016)
Momenti straordinari con applausi finti, Bologna, Coconino Press, 2019. 
MBDL - My badly drawn life, Seattle, Fantagraphics Books Inc, 2022.

Short stories
The Innocents (Gli innocenti, 2005)
They Found the Car (Hanno ritrovato la macchina, 2006)
Diario di fiume e altre storie (2009)
Verticali (2009)
Baci dalla provincia (2011)

Filmography 
 The Last Man on Earth (2011)
 Smettere di fumare fumando (2012)
 Il ragazzo più felice del mondo (2018)
  (dir. Claudio Cupellini, 2021)

References

External links

Gipi’s website
Words Without Borders:  “Taken from Life: An Interview with Gipi”

Italian cartoonists
Italian comics artists
People from Pisa
1963 births
Living people
Inkpot Award winners